Mount LeMasurier is an ice-free coastal mountain which rises to more than  between Mount Vance and Mount Langway, in the central part of the Ickes Mountains of Marie Byrd Land, Antarctica. The feature was discovered and photographed from aircraft of the United States Antarctic Service, 1939–41, and was named by the Advisory Committee on Antarctic Names for Wesley E. LeMasurier, a geologist with the Marie Byrd Land Survey II, 1967–68. Later, LeMasurier continued research as a faculty member of the geology department at University of Colorado at Denver. In 2018, he is still actively publishing scholarly articles and participating in research projects out of CU Boulder's campus.

References

Mountains of Marie Byrd Land